San Venerio Lighthouse is an active lighthouse on the island of Tino, in the comune of Porto Venere in the Province of La Spezia, Liguria, Italy. Its construction began in 1839, and completed in 1840. It illuminates and guides the sailors in that part of Ligurian Sea. It is named for Venerius the Hermit, the patron saint of lighthouse keepers.

History 
San Venerio Lighthouse is a fortified neoclassical building, despite having undergone many changes over time. Construction of the lighthouse was granted by King Charles Albert of Savoy and was initially fueled by vegetable oil, followed later by coal. This system gave too much power to the beam of light, and in 1912 the fuel was replaced with petroleum. The lighthouse was later electrified, and became fully automated in 1985.

The lighthouse is completely controlled and operated by the Marina Militare based in La Spezia.

In the evening, near Lerici (located on the opposite side of the Gulf of La Spezia) or the Cinque Terre the light can be seen flashing across the sea in the darkness.

See also
 List of lighthouses in Italy

References

External links

 Servizio Fari Marina Militare 

Lighthouses completed in 1840
Lighthouses in Italy
Buildings and structures in Liguria
Province of La Spezia